The 1991 Supercopa Libertadores Finals were the finals of the fourth edition of the Supercopa Libertadores football tournament. It was contested by Argentine club River Plate and Brazilian side Cruzeiro, which played their second Supercopa final. 

The first leg of the tie was played at Estadio Monumental in Buenos Aires, River Plate won 2–0. In the second leg, held in Mineirão in Belo Horizonte, Cruzeiro won 3–0. As both teams equaled on points, Cruzeiro won the series 3–2 on aggregate, thus achieving their first Supercopa trophy.

Qualified teams

Venues

Match details

First leg

Second leg

References

	 	

	

s
Supercopa Libertadores Finals
Football in Buenos Aires
s
s